Ricardo Munguía Pérez (born 5 June 1975) is a Mexican retired footballer who played as a defender.

Career

Club career
In 1999, he played abroad in the USL A-League with the Toronto Lynx. On 17 July 2007, Munguía went on trial with the Serbian White Eagles in the Canadian Soccer League (CSL). His trial was successful and he joined the club a few days later after his international transfer was approved by the Ontario Soccer Association. He debuted for the club on 10 August 2007 in a 6–3 win over the North York Astros. Munguía was an integral part of the White Eagles squad but injured his knee in the semifinal against the Trois-Rivières Attak thus missing out on the final against Toronto Croatia.

Munguía (known in Mexico as El Ringo) was captain of Albinegros for the 2010 season. Munguía re-joined the Serbian White Eagles prior to the 2011 CSL season. In 2015, he returned to the CSL to play with Scarborough SC.

International career
He was part of the Mexican national under-20 team that played in the 1993 FIFA World Youth Championship. He also won a silver medal with Mexico at the 1995 Pan American Games.

Managerial career
Munguía was named the head coach in 2016 for Scarborough SC in the Canadian Soccer League. He is also an academy coach for Cherry Beach Soccer Club.

Personal
His late father Ricardo Munguía Padilla (also nicknamed Ringo) was also a footballer.

References

External links
 Ricardo Munguía Pérez at Liga MX (in Spanish)

1975 births
Living people
Footballers from Mexico City
Mexico under-20 international footballers
Mexican expatriate footballers
Mexican footballers
Expatriate soccer players in Canada
Serbian White Eagles FC players
Toronto Lynx players
A-League (1995–2004) players
C.D. Veracruz footballers
Lagartos de Tabasco footballers
Albinegros de Orizaba footballers
Correcaminos UAT footballers
Altamira F.C. players
Liga MX players
Ascenso MX players
Canadian Soccer League (1998–present) players
Scarborough SC players
Canadian Soccer League (1998–present) managers
Association football central defenders
Mexican football managers